Glycidyl methacrylate (GMA) is an ester of methacrylic acid and glycidol. Containing both an epoxide and an acrylate groups, the molecule is bifunctional. It is a common monomer used in the production of epoxy resins. While typical home epoxies contain diglycidyl ether of bisphenol A (DGEBA),  glycidyl methacrylate is instead used to provide epoxy functionalization to polyolefins and other acrylate resins. Glycidyl methacrylate is produced by several companies worldwide, including Dow Chemical.  It is used to prepare a range of composites.

See also
Acrylate polymer
Acrylate
Methacrylate

References

Monomers
Epoxides
Methacrylate esters